Argentine Nation to the Heroic Valour in Combat Cross is the highest national military decoration in Argentina.

The decoration consists of a silver cross pattée bearing the Coat of arms of Argentina in gold, suspended from a chest ribbon of equal light blue-white-light blue stripes.

Recipients of the decoration for service during the 1982 Falklands War are listed below.

Posthumous

Argentine Army
Lieutenant Roberto Estévez -  25th Infantry Regiment (Argentina)
Lieutenant Ernesto Emilio Espinosa-  602 Commando Company
Sergeant First Class Mateo Antonio Sbert-  602 Commando Company

Argentine Navy
Commander Pedro Edgardo Giachino - Amphibious Commandos Group
Petty Officer First Class Julio Castillo. The ship ARA Suboficial Castillo (A-6) was named after him.

Argentine Air Force
Captain Omar Jesús Castillo - Pilot Grupo 4
Captain José Daniel Luis Vazquez - Pilot Grupo 4

During lifetime

Argentine Army
1st Lieutenant Jorge Manuel Vizoso - 602 Commando Company
2nd Lieutenant Juan José Gomez Centurión -  C/25th Infantry Regiment (Argentina)
Corporal First Class Roberto Bacilio Baruzzo -  RI 12
S/C 62 Oscar Ismael Poltronieri -   RI Mec 6

Argentine Navy
Lieutenant (Navy) Owen Guillermo Crippa - Aermacchi MB-339 Pilot Argentine Naval Aviation
Lieutenant (JG) Héctor Miño

Argentine Air Force
Captain Pablo Marcos Rafael Carballo - A-4 Skyhawk Pilot Grupo 5
Lieutenant Ernesto Rubén Ureta - A-4 Skyhawk Pilot Grupo 4
2nd Lieutenant Gerardo Guillermo Isaac - A-4 Skyhawk Pilot Grupo 4
Sergeant Pedro Prudencio Miranda
Sergeant Carlos Omar Ortiz

See also 
Argentine Nation to the Valour in Combat Medal
List of military decorations

References 

Orders, decorations, and medals of Argentina
Courage awards